Eupithecia reisserata is a moth in the family Geometridae. It is found in Anatolia, Jordan, Azerbaijan, Syria, Greece and on Cyprus.

The wingspan is about 15–17 mm.

Subspecies
Eupithecia reisserata reisserata
Eupithecia reisserata levarii Hausmann, 1991 (Jordan)

References

Moths described in 1976
reisserata
Moths of Europe
Moths of Asia